Fabiol Rexhepi (born 18 December 1991 in Shkodër) is an Albanian footballer who currently plays for Besëlidhja Lezhë in the Albanian First Division.

References

External links
 Profile - FSHF

1991 births
Living people
Footballers from Shkodër
Albanian footballers
Association football goalkeepers
KF Vllaznia Shkodër players
KF Naftëtari Kuçovë players
FK Sukhti players
Besëlidhja Lezhë players
KF Tërbuni Pukë players
Kategoria Superiore players
Kategoria e Parë players
Kategoria e Dytë players